This is a list of writers in English and Cornish, who are associated with Cornwall and Cornish linguists. Not all of them are native Cornish people.

Some Cornish writers have reached a high level of prominence, e.g. William Golding, who won the Nobel Prize for literature (in 1983), D. M. Thomas who won the Cheltenham Prize for Literature and Arthur Quiller-Couch ("Q").

Some of the "incomers" have written extensively about Cornwall and the Cornish, e.g. Daphne du Maurier, who went as far as joining Mebyon Kernow.

Historians and scholars
See List of Cornish historians

Novelists

 Denys Val Baker, novelist and writer
 A. P. Bateman, thriller writer and bestselling author
 Wilfred Bennetto, writer of the first full-length novel in Cornish
 Janie Bolitho, crime writer
 W. J. Burley, Wycliffe series
 Jack Clemo, poet
Myrna Combellack, novelist and scholar
 Michael J Darracott, writer, lived in Newlyn 
 Daphne du Maurier
 Martin Fido. crime writer
 Patrick Gale
 Robert Goddard
 William Golding, Nobel laureate
 Winston Graham, Poldark series
 Tim Heald
 Joseph Hocking, author and preacher
 Silas Hocking, author and preacher
 Ann Kelley
 Alan M. Kent, poet, novelist and scholar
 John le Carré
 Charles Lee, (1870–1956)
 Katharine Lee (Kitty Lee Jenner, 1854–1936)
 Herman Cyril McNeile, "Sapper", novelist
 Jessica Mann, crime writer
 Charlotte Mary Matheson, novelist
 Wyl Menmuir, novelist
 Gertrude Parsons, Roman Catholic novelist
 Mark Guy Pearse, author and preacher
 Susan Penhaligon
 Rosamunde Pilcher
 Arthur Quiller-Couch, aka "Q", novelist and scholar
 Alastair Reynolds, lived in Cornwall as child
 Jean Rhys, novelist, lived at Bude for a period
 Angie Sage, author and illustrator
 Howard Spring
 Sharon Tregenza
 Derek Tangye
 Nigel Tangye
 D. M. Thomas
 E. V. Thompson
 Enys Tregarthen, writer and folklorist
 John Coulson Tregarthen, novelist and naturalist
 Craig Weatherhill, archaeologist, Cornish historian, writer
 Mary Wesley
 Colin Wilson

Poets

Playwrights and dramatists
 Nick Darke, playwright
 Daphne du Maurier, novelist and playwright
 Samuel Foote, playwright and actor
 William Golding
 William Killigrew, playwright
 Charles Lee
 Donald Rawe
 D. M. Thomas

Children's writers
 Nick Carter
 Ann Kelley
 Jack Trelawny
 Sharon Tregenza

Linguists and writers in Cornish

Bards of the Gorseth Kernow
This is an honorary position, not all of the bards are Cornish or based in Cornwall. For purposes of brevity, those mentioned above are not repeated.

References

Further reading
William Henry Kearley Wright, West-country Poets: their lives and works (1896)

External links
 Poetry Cornwall

Writers
Cornish literature
Literature of England

Cornwall